The Speaker of the House of Representatives of Egypt is the presiding officer of that body. From the creation of the Shura Council in 1980 until its abolition in 2014, the House of Representatives was the lower house of the Parliament of Egypt.

List of officeholders

Sources
 Official website of the People's Assembly of Egypt

Politics of Egypt
Egypt
Speaker list